Steriphopus is a genus of palp-footed spiders that was first described by Eugène Louis Simon in 1887.

Species
 it contains four species, found only in Asia, Sri Lanka, and on the Seychelles:
Steriphopus crassipalpis Thorell, 1895 – Myanmar
Steriphopus gyirongensis (Hu & Li, 1987) – China
Steriphopus lacertosus Simon, 1898 – Seychelles
Steriphopus macleayi (O. Pickard-Cambridge, 1873) (type) – Sri Lanka

See also
 List of Palpimanidae species

References

Araneomorphae genera
Palpimanidae
Spiders of Africa
Spiders of Asia